Scott Danberg (born July 28, 1962) is a Paralympic athlete from Florida in the United States competing in F40 events. Danberg has appeared in five Paralympics representing America in track and field, swimming and powerlifting.

His wife Pamela is also a Paralympic athlete. They married in 1988 and have a son.

References

External links
 

1968 births
Living people
American male discus throwers
American male shot putters
American male javelin throwers
American male swimmers
American powerlifters
Paralympic track and field athletes of the United States
Paralympic silver medalists for the United States
Paralympic medalists in athletics (track and field)
Athletes (track and field) at the 1988 Summer Paralympics
Swimmers at the 1988 Summer Paralympics
Athletes (track and field) at the 2004 Summer Paralympics
Athletes (track and field) at the 2008 Summer Paralympics
Athletes (track and field) at the 2012 Summer Paralympics
Medalists at the 1988 Summer Paralympics
Medalists at the 2007 Parapan American Games
Paralympic discus throwers
Paralympic javelin throwers
Paralympic shot putters